Aslan Mercenary Ships is a 1982 role-playing game supplement for Traveller published by FASA.

Contents
Aslan Mercenary Ships is FASA's second set of boxed ship plans, and includes complete deck plans and descriptions of two 3,000-ton vessels in use in by Aslan mercenary companies.

Publication history
Aslan Mercenary Ships was written by J. Andrew Keith, Jordan Weisman, and Ross Babcock III, and was published in 1982 by FASA as a boxed set containing two digest-sized 16-page pamphlets, three large maps, and counters.

Reception
William A. Barton reviewed Aslan Mercenary Ships in The Space Gamer No. 57. Barton commented that "I recommend Aslan Mercenary Ships even more than its companion set, especially for those Traveller players who hunger for more on the Aslan corner of the universe."

Bob McWilliams reviewed Aslan Mercenary Ships for White Dwarf #36, giving it an overall rating of 6 out of 10 for the novice, and 8 for the expert, and stated that "the plans themselves and the supporting material show continuing improvement over past efforts from the company."

Reviews
 Different Worlds'' #25 (Oct./Nov., 1982)

References

Role-playing game supplements introduced in 1982
Traveller (role-playing game) supplements